Yecid Arturo Sierra Sánchez (born 16 August 1994) is a Colombian cyclist, who currently rides for Uruguayan amateur team CNP Bocas del Cufré and Colomban amateur team Liga Cundinamarca.

Major results

2012 
 2nd Road race, National Junior Road Championships
2018
 5th Overall Tour of Qinghai Lake
2019
 5th Overall Tour of Qinghai Lake
 6th Overall Tour de Ijen
 10th Overall Tour of Iran (Azerbaijan)
2022
 1st Stage 3 Tour Ciclístico de Panamá

References

External links

1994 births
Living people
Colombian male cyclists
People from Facatativá